Saray, or seray (also spelt saraya or seraya), is a Turkish word from , traditionally translated as serail or seraglio via Italian influence. The term is usually referred to:
 Saray (building), a castle/palace/headquarters in the Ottoman Empire,
or, per derivation:
 Saray (harem), the sequestered living quarters used by wives and concubines in an Ottoman household

It may also refer to:

Buildings 
 Palace of the Shirvanshahs is a 15th-century palace built by the Shirvanshahs and described by UNESCO as "one of the pearls of Azerbaijan's architecture"
 Bogdan Saray, an Eastern Orthodox church in Istanbul, Turkey
 Ismailiyya Palace is a historical building that currently serves as the Presidium of the Academy of Sciences of Azerbaijan
 Gulustan Palace during the Soviet era is the main state convention center of the Azerbaijani government
 Grand Serail, Ottoman barracks and seat of the prime minister of Lebanon
 Petit Serail, an administrative building in Ottoman Beirut, destroyed in 1951
 Jumeirah Zabeel Saray, a resort located on the west crescent of The Palm in Dubai, United Arab Emirates
 Agha Gahraman Mirsiyab Saray is an 18th-century Azerbaijani saray and caravanserai located in Karabakh region of Azerbaijan

Places

Azerbaijan 
 Saray, Absheron
 Saray, Qubadli

Bosnia and Herzegovina 
 Sarajevo, the capital city and largest urban centre of Bosnia and Herzegovina

Iran 
 Saray, East Azerbaijan
 Saray, Marand, East Azerbaijan Province
 Saray, Osku, East Azerbaijan Province
 Saray, Hamadan
 Saray, Isfahan
 Saray-ye Sheykh Ali
 Saray Mohammad Hoseyn

Iraq 
 Saray Azadi, a square in the old town centre in the Kurdish city of Sulaymania

Turkey 
 Saray, Kazan, a village and neighborhood in Kazan district of Ankara Province
 Saray, Tekirdağ, a town and district in Tekirdağ Province
 Saray (District), Van, a district in Van Province
 Sarayburnu, a promontory in Istanbul, where the Topkapı Palace stands
 Bahçesaray (District), Van, a district in Van Province, literally "garden palace"

Ukraine 
 Bakhchisaray (Bağçasaray/Bahçesaray), the former capital of the Crimean Khanate, literally "garden palace"

People 
 Saray García (born 1984), Spanish footballer
 Tum Saray (born 1992), Cambodian footballer
 Saray Mulk Khanum (1343–1406), Empress of the Timurid Empire as the chief consort of Timur

Other uses 
 Saray Masjid, is a mosque of the 15th century, which is included in Shirvanshah's palace complex in Baku, Azerbaijan
 Saray helva, a popular Turkish confectionery
 Saray (military unit), a military unit in the Arab world

See also 
 Sarah (disambiguation)
 Sarai (disambiguation)
 Saraya (disambiguation)
 Seraiah, a Hebrew name
 Seraya (disambiguation)
 Saray hamam, is bath houses, dated back to the 15th century and are a part of the Shirvanshahs' Palace Complex in Azerbaijan
 Galatasaray (disambiguation)
 Caravanserai, a kind of roadside inn